Bad Bibra is a town in the Burgenlandkreis district, in Saxony-Anhalt, Germany. It is situated northwest of Naumburg. It is part of the Verbandsgemeinde ("collective municipality") An der Finne. Since July 2009 it has included the former municipalities of Altenroda, Golzen and Thalwinkel. In 2020, the town gained media attention for selling Deutsches Reichsbräu, a neo-nazi style beer.

Personality 

 Erdmann Neumeister (1671-1756), hymns poet and theologian; from 1696 pastor in Bibra and to 1700/1702 author of the poem "Nachdenckliche Betrachtungen des curieusen Brunnengastes zu Biebra".(Considerations about the spa tourists in Biebra)
 Christoph Förster (1693-1745), composer and violinist
 Friedrich Zippel (1887-1960) was a Protestant priest, a member of the Confessing Church (BK), NS Victim and prisoner in Dachau concentration camp.
 Friedrich August Ludwig Nietzsche (1756-1826) in Eilenburg), German theologian, grandfather of the philosopher Friedrich Nietzsche.

References 

Burgenlandkreis
Spa towns in Germany